Brit Hoel (born 19 December 1942 in Arendal) is a Norwegian politician for the Labour Party.

She was elected to the Norwegian Parliament from Aust-Agder in 1981, and was re-elected on three occasions. She had previously served in the position of deputy representative during the terms 1981–1985.

On the local level she was a member of Øyestad municipal council from 1975 to 1979.

From 2000 to 2002 she worked at the Office of the Auditor General of Norway. She has been involved in the Norwegian Association of Local and Regional Authorities and the Norwegian Heart and Lung Patient Organisation.

References

1942 births
Living people
Labour Party (Norway) politicians
Members of the Storting
Aust-Agder politicians
People from Arendal
Women members of the Storting
20th-century Norwegian politicians
20th-century Norwegian women politicians